Bororo of Cabaçal (Bororo do Cabaçal) is an extinct Bororoan language that was spoken around the Cabaçal River in Mato Grosso, Brazil. It has been documented in word lists collected by Johann Natterer in 1825 and by Francis de Castelnau in the 1840s. Bororo of Cabaçal was recently identified by Camargo (2014) as a separate language distinct from Bororo proper.

References

Bororoan languages
Indigenous languages of South America
Languages of Brazil
Extinct languages of South America
Mamoré–Guaporé linguistic area